Amiens (English:  or  ; ; ,  or ) is a city and commune in northern France, located  north of Paris and  south-west of Lille. It is the capital of the Somme department in the region of Hauts-de-France. In 2021, the population of Amiens was 135,429. A central landmark of the city is Amiens Cathedral, the largest Gothic cathedral in France. Amiens also has one of the largest university hospitals in France, with a capacity of 1,200 beds. The author Jules Verne lived in Amiens from 1871 until his death in 1905, and served on the city council for 15 years. Incumbent French president Emmanuel Macron was born in Amiens.

The town was fought over during both World Wars, suffering significant damage, and was repeatedly occupied by both sides. The 1918 Battle of Amiens was the opening phase of the Hundred Days Offensive which directly led to the Armistice with Germany. The Royal Air Force heavily bombed the town during the Second World War. In the aftermath, the city was rebuilt according to Pierre Dufau's plans with wider streets to ease traffic congestion. These newer structures were primarily built of brick, concrete and white stone with slate roofs. The architect Auguste Perret designed the Gare d'Amiens train station and nearby Tour Perret.

Amiens has an important historical and cultural heritage, on which a significant amount of tourism is based. During December, the town hosts the largest Christmas market in northern France. It is known for a few local foods, including "macarons d'Amiens", almond paste biscuits; "tuiles amienoises", chocolate and orange curved biscuits; "pâté de canard d'Amiens", duck pâté in pastry; "la ficelle Picarde", an oven-baked cheese-topped crêpe; and "flamiche aux poireaux", a puff pastry tart made with leeks and cream.

History

The first known settlement at this location was Samarobriva ("Somme bridge"), the central settlement of the Ambiani tribe, one of the principal tribes of Gaul. The Romans named the town Ambianum, meaning settlement of the Ambiani people. 
Amiens was part of Francia starting from the 5th century. The Normans sacked the city in 859 and again in 882.
In 1113, the city was recognized by King Louis VI of France, and in 1185 it was linked to the Crown of France. In 1597, Spanish soldiers held the city during the six-month Siege of Amiens, before Henry IV regained control. During the 18th and 19th century, the textile tradition of Amiens became famous for its velours. As a result of the French Revolution, the provinces of France were dismantled and the territory was organised into departments. Much of Picardy became the newly created department of Somme with Amiens as the departmental capital. During the industrial revolution, the city walls were demolished, opening up space for large boulevards around the town center. The Henriville neighborhood in the south of the city was developed around this time. In 1848, the first railway arrived in Amiens, linking the city to Boulogne-sur-Mer. During the 1870 Battle of Amiens, the city was occupied by invading Prussian forces.

The town was fought over during both the First and Second World Wars, suffering significant damage and being occupied several times by both sides. The 1918 Battle of Amiens was the opening phase of the Hundred Days Offensive which led directly to the Armistice with Germany that ended the war. It was heavily bombed by the Royal Air Force during the Second World War. The city was rebuilt according to Pierre Dufau's plans with a focus on widening the streets to ease traffic congestion. These newer structures were primarily built of brick, concrete and white stone with slate roofs. The architect Auguste Perret designed the Gare d'Amiens train station and nearby Tour Perret.

Geography

Location

Amiens, the regional prefecture of Picardy, also functions as the prefecture of the Somme department, one of the three departments (with Oise and Aisne) in the region. Located in the Paris Basin, the city benefits from a privileged geographical position, with close proximity to Paris, Lille, Rouen, London and Brussels. At the crossroads of major European routes of travel (A1, A16 and A29), the city is also at the heart of a major rail star.

In area, Amiens is the third-largest settlement in the Somme, after Crécy-en-Ponthieu and Hornoy-le-Bourg.

Geology and relief

Hydrography: Somme and canal, Avre and Selle

The main stem of the River Somme passes through Amiens and is generally benign, except during exceptional floods that can last up to several weeks (such as in spring 2001). It is also, on its southeastern outskirts, close to Camon and Longueau, the confluence with its main tributary on the left bank (to the south), and the Avre. The Selle enters from the northwest of Amiens, with two arms (including the Haute Selle) passing behind the Unicorn Stadium, the exhibition park, the megacity and horse racing track, then passing the end of the Promenade de la Hotoie and the zoo of Amiens, and to the right of the water treatment plant, in front of the island Sainte-Aragone, opposite the cemetery of La Madeleine in Amiens.

The Amiens citadel is built on this limestone butte of the Picard plateau and Rue Saint-Pierre is a slightly inclined path to leave the city from the north. At this narrowing, a network of narrow canals led to the construction of bridges and buildings including textile mills in the Middle Ages.

The marshes of the old bed of the river Somme was used to dig peat. Farmers maintained rieux, canals and ditches by cleaning out the silt and used it to append to their vegetable garden plot, the hortillons. Beginning in the 20 th century the descendants of hortillons stopped maintaining the canals and the areas were gradually left to lie fallow or sold to private individuals who created pleasure gardens accessible by boat.

The hydrographic network has always been an important city-operated asset. The river helped shape the identity of the landscape, urban and economic territory. It is around the quarters of Saint-Leu, Saint-Maurice bordering the River Somme and most of the administrative and civil area of the current city center which the city has developed since antiquity.

The Canal de la Somme dates from the beginning of the 19th century and the bridge at the foot of the citadel was built after World War II.

Climate
Amiens has the typical oceanic climate of the north of France, with relatively mild winters, cool summers, and rainfall well distributed throughout the year.

Transport
Amiens is a hub between the Île de France and the rest of northern France; Normandy and Benelux; and France and Great Britain. Amiens is not directly on principal European road and rail arteries, such as the A1 motorway and the Paris-Lille TGV train line, at present.

However, due to its position halfway between the urban areas of Lille and Paris, Amiens has good conditions for service and accessibility, including motorways (at the junction of the A16 and A29).

Rail 
Amiens station is served by regional train services to destinations that include Rouen, Calais, Lille, Reims, Compiègne and Paris-Nord. Saint-Roch (Somme) station in the western part of the city is served by local trains towards Rouen and Abbeville. A regular bus route with the TGV Haute-Picardie station also provides access to the Charles-de-Gaulle Airport station. On the horizon of 2025, the Roissy–Picardie Link will put Amiens 55 minutes from Paris Charles-de-Gaulle Airport and its TGV station.

By train, Amiens is located at:

Roads

Since antiquity, Amiens has been a crossroads of important routes. The contemporary city is served by the A16 and A29 autoroutes. The A16 and A29 autoroutes, the RN1 and the RN25 form a bypass-type motorway around the city that the population has called the Rocade d'Amiens [ring road of Amiens]. Initially constituting national roads which are downgraded today, mostly as departmental roads, the greater urban area of Amiens is served by:

Amiens is served by several motorways:
 A16 to Calais via Abbeville and Boulogne-sur-Mer
 A16 to Paris via Beauvais
 A29 to Rouen and Le Havre via Neufchâtel-en-Bray
 A29 to Reims via Saint-Quentin and Laon
 The proposed A24 autoroute from Amiens to Lille via Doullens was cancelled in 2006.

Parking

Although important, demand for parking is less than what is available (capacity reserves are still 20% minimum: If the road is sometimes saturated, the occupancy rate of the underground parking remains globally less than 100%).

In 2013, the city counted approximately 70,000 public parking spaces, including 8,400 in the city center and in its immediate vicinity, where 70% of places are paid.
 4,400 spaces on highways (1,950 in the inner city, including 1,600 paid)
 4,000 spaces in underground parking (620 other new places are programmed in a project for the Gare La Vallée development zone).

The underground car parks in the city center are organised thus:

, a residential parking system has been deployed in Saint-Anne ward to cope with congestion in the streets caused by SNCF railway station users. During the campaign for the municipal election of 2008, parking was one of the important topics of debate. A year after the change of majority, the  team launched a consultation with the population. From 2011, residential parking was extended to the Gare-La-Vallée and Riolan neighborhoods, then in 2012 to the Noyon neighborhood and the area east of the Riolan sector. In 2014, 2,600 parking spaces were affected by this system which allowed city residents more parking near their homes in order to promote a better rotation of vehicles in the streets and reduce permanent occupation of public space by the cars cluttering the highway.

Public transport

They intersect at Place Gambetta, one linking , the Church of Saint-Acheul, Cagnard bridge, Rue de Noyon and Rue Jules-Barni; the other from the Church of Saint-Pierre at the racecourse, by the streets of Saint-Leu, Frédéric-Petit and Colbert. Electrified in 1899, the network grew to seven lines totaling  in 1906. From 1932, Longueau was linked to Amiens by a bus service. German bombing in 1940 destroyed most of the city center and hit the Jules-Ferry Road tram , totally destroying the tram fleet. Only the Longueau bus survived. A few old Parisian buses were also used in an extremely reduced service. These buses as well as the surviving bus were then converted to city gas and equipped with tanks on the roof covered by a huge white dome. This service continued until approximately 1946. There were only two urban lines: An east–west line (Saint-Acheul – Montieres) and a northeast–southwest line (Beauville – road to Rouen). It was decided after the war to serve the city by a trolleybus with one route to Longueau. This was only in part realized, serving Saint-Acheul, Rouen, La Madeleine and Saint-Pierre. In 1964, trolleybuses were abandoned and the bus became ubiquitous in Amiens transportation.

The bus network is today managed by the Ametis , whose network covers Amiens Métropole, the agglomeration of Amiens. The establishment of dedicated bus lanes began in 2006. Former Mayor Gilles de Robien had envisioned the creation of a tram, but the choice of dedicated bus lanes had been preferred for reasons of cost and patronage. As a result of numerous studies and conferences, elected representatives voted for the creation of a tram at the municipal Council of 15 November 2012. The project had been endorsed by the Communauté d'agglomération Amiens Métropole on 18 December 2012 and the commissioning of a first north–south  was scheduled for 2018/2019. Improvement of public transit would then be only by that of the bus network. Indeed, in December of the same year, the Community Council approved funding for a study (the sixth in 20 years) relating to the establishment of a rapid transit  (BHNS), which should enter into service in March 2019, and whose vehicles could be electric.

Cycle networks

 Buscyclette is a service of rental bikes on demand, created in May 1999. In 2014, nearly 2,400 "green bikes" are available for rent, essentially city bikes but also electric bikes (VAE), folding bicycles and specific bikes (kids bikes, child trailers, mountain bikes, cargo bikes, tandems, etc.). The rental period varies from half a day to one year.
  is a bike sharing system (VLS) created on 16 February 2008, an adaptation of the  system managed by JCDecaux, similar to Vélo'v in Lyon and Vélib' in Paris.  offers 313 bikes distributed every 300 to 400 metres in the center of Amiens and 26 stations.

In 2012, Amiens Métropole had  of routes for cyclists.

Railways

There are three railway stations:
 Two stations on the Paris-Boulogne and Amiens – Rouen lines:
The Amiens station, main station, known as Gare du Nord, in memory of the Compagnie du Nord who created it. Every day, 15,000 travelers use its seven lines.
The station of Saint-Roch

Connections from these two stations include to Lille via Arras and Douai, to Boulogne via Abbeville, to Paris-Nord via Creil or Compiègne, to Reims via Tergnier, and to Rouen.
 A station located on the Paris – Lille line in Longueau serving south of Amiens and the communes of Longueau, Cagny, Boves, etc.
Longueau station, a passenger station of the historic railway hub in Longueau. Every day, 2,500 travellers use its two lines.
 , station assigned to the freight traffic, it serves only the industrial zone of Amiens. This station is located on the former railway line of Doullens.

Many regional and extra regional links (Normandie, Grand Est and Île-de-France) pass through Amiens, especially by TER Hauts-de-France.

It is served by buses from Amiens. Its isolated character earned it the name of gare des betteraves, or gare betteraves, at the time of its construction.

Air transport
In addition to Amiens – Glisy Aerodrome, bordering the town's eastern edge  from the center, there are several airports nearby.
 Albert – Picardie Airport is located 20 minutes northeast of the city.
 Beauvais-Tillé Airport, the ninth largest French airport by usage, located 45 minutes by car south of the city, and served by a bus service from Amiens.
 Lille Airport, reachable by train or by road using the A29 and A1.
 Paris-Charles de Gaulle Airport, reachable by train or by road using the A29 and A1, or A16 and N104. The creation of a railway between Creil and Roissy will put Amiens 55 minutes from Paris Charles de Gaulle airport by 2020.

Waterways
The Somme canal runs through the town to the English Channel. This canal is linked to the Canal du Nord (Paris to Lille metropolitan area).

Urbanism

Urban morphology

Amiens comprises a number of neighbourhoods ("quartiers" in French) with their own characteristics, including Saint-Leu, St-Maurice, Henriville, and Saint-Acheul.

Saint-Leu quarter
St-Leu forms part of Amiens, north of the city center. It has many older wooden and brick houses and several canals. At the foot of the cathedral, traversed by canals, this picturesque area was largely rehabilitated during the 1990s. Historically, it was the poor quarter of the city, where butchers, tanners and dyers gathered.

Amiens University's Faculty of Sciences, present since the 1960s, has been renovated and expanded on occasion. The Faculty of Law and Economics has also been transferred since the mid-1990s from the campus (offset to the south of the city) to its new location at the foot of the cathedral. The open-air parking it replaces was a "gap" in the landscape dating from World War II. Nonetheless, it allowed an unobstructed view of the cathedral. Most of the buildings have been renovated and transformed into housing much of which is for students, many of whom are in the quarter.

The area became the heart of the Amiens people's evenings, with many establishments (bars, restaurants, etc.) on Place du Don and Quai Bélu.

The church is found at Rue Saint-Leu, located just between the Faculty of Science and Law-Economy (UPJV).

Two theatres were established in the quarter, that of the Chés Cabotans (puppet shows in the Picard language) and the Maison du Théâtre at the foot of the Saint-Leu Church. There is also La Lune des Pirates, a concert hall.

Saint-Maurice quarter
It is currently undergoing significant housing renovation and development.

Bordered by the Canal de la Somme, it offers a stopover for leisure boats, which must go through a lock.

The École supérieure d'ingénieurs en électronique et électrotechnique (ESIEE) is in the same quarter.

The , known as the Jardin du Roy within the city, is also located in this quarter.

Henriville-quarter
The Henriville neighborhood was mostly built during the 19th century after the demolition of the city wall. It lies at the south of the town center. It has numerous bourgeois houses and townhouses, predominantly in brick, blending architectural styles of the period, including neoclassical, troubadour and neo-Gothic. There are also private mansions, such as the Acloque mansion and the house of Jules Verne.

Saint-Acheul quarter
The Saint-Acheul quarter existed before Amiens' inception, as people have lived there since prehistoric times. This is where archaeological excavations in the nineteenth century discovered prehistoric tool sets typical of the "Acheulean" prehistorical era, named after this neighborhood (also spelled Acheulian, pronounced ). Civilians can freely visit the archaeological garden there.

It also contains the Church of Saint-Acheul, and the former normal school of teachers which became the Lycée Robert-de-Luzarches. A number of famous people are buried in the former Saint-Acheul cemetery such as the creator of Bécassine J.P. Pinchon, and many resistance fighters. Part of the quarter includes a so-called "English neighborhood," with typical English style houses.

Other neighborhoods
Amiens, like other big cities, has its large HLM high-rise tower blocks:
 North of the city the quarters du Pigeonnier, which is famous for its weekend market, Messenger, Mozart, Fafet-Brossolette-la Cité, Balzac, Léo Lagrange-Schweitzer, etc.;
 Southeast of the city: Victorine-Autier, Philéas Lebesgue, Condorcet, Pierre-Rollin.
 West: Etouvie and Montières (an ecodistrict is provided in this industrial space, where there are 19th century in brick buildings).
 East: Saint-Acheul-la-Cité and the Clos de l'Avre.

These areas experience a lot of social troubles and have regularly been the place for riots. The northern quarters were the scene of violent events in 1994, 1999 and 2000 (clashes between several districts of the city and between the neighbourhoods of Amiens and the districts of Creil), in 2006 and 2008 (in the wake of incidents in the Paris suburbs) and more recently in August 2012 following a conflict between youth and the police. These extremely violent riots caused sixteen police officers to be injured.

An extensive programme of redevelopment of these neighborhoods began recently, with demolition of HLM tower blocks and new infrastructure having been built, especially for schools. In 2009, the public transport network of the Amiens agglomeration was significantly modified.

Housing

In 2017, the total number of dwellings in the municipality was 73,541, while it was 63,178 in 1999.

Among this housing, 88.7% were primary residences, 2.1% of secondary residences and 9.2% vacant housing. These dwellings were 35.6% of houses and 63.4% of apartments.

The proportion of principal residences, which were the properties of occupants, was 31.9%, down from 2007 (34.4%). The share of empty rented HLM homes (social housing) was up: 29.8% against 29.4% in 2007, their number increased from 18,268 to 19,431.

The identity of the city is strongly marked by the specificity of its housing stock, consisting in a large proportion of detached houses, semi-detached, single or bourgeois: the amiénoises. These traditional houses in the suburbs, in brick, were intrinsically linked to the expansion of the city during and after the Industrial Revolution.

The amiénoise simple includes a window on the ground floor and floors for attic and basement. It is built on a plot of a few metres wide but is very deep, and includes a garden, forming hearts with green islets and sparse areas. The amiénoise double has two windows at each level. The grandes amiénoises and townhouses rise to at least two floors with large rooms. They can have a gate opening onto a paved courtyard.

The official buildings or mansions regularly use brick façades on a sandstone base, decorated by stone window and door frames.

The Chanoines quarter has stone façades exclusively.

In historic areas such as the  quarter, façades widely use wood, half-timbered or siding, and wattle and daub.

Development projects
 Amiens 2030: Amiens, in the context of the Communauté d'agglomération Amiens Métropole, is developing a master development plan called Amiens 2030. This strategic outreach project is centered around the priority issues of economic, social and cultural development of the agglomeration. The whole process of reflection will determine the development of the metropolis by 2030.
This university construction program is intended to strengthen regional competitiveness and the development of higher education and research. The project, entrusted to the Italian architect Renzo Piano, will be accessible to all inhabitants.
 ZAC Gare-la-Vallée: The project intends to strengthen Amiens in its role as the regional capital and allow the creation of a genuine business district in the heart of the city. With a budget of €157 million, the project combines tertiary activities, shops and a habitat walk from the station and the inner city. The first buildings were inaugurated in 2008. The second phase of development extended from 2012 to 2017.
 ZAC Intercampus: This new housing and services quarter in the south of the city is projected to host 1,900 dwellings by 2030. A first tranche of 850 dwellings must be delivered in 2015. Located in the immediate vicinity of the campus and the CHU d'Amiens, it will be served by a future TCSP. It will include  of gardens.
Designed in 4 slices, together with its inhabitants, it entered its final phase of development in 2013.
 ZAC Renancourt: This new quarter must ensure the development of the city to the west. Located between the Grâce Valley, the Selle Valley, the Renancourt quarter and its suburb, this planning area is a natural viewpoint over the city. By 2018, this residential area is projected to accommodate 1,400 houses, a hotel, facilities and shops.
 Bus rapid transit (BRT): A project of three BRT lines is under consideration for commissioning in 2019, at the end of two years of work. Estimated at €85 million excluding taxes, and spanning , the project would include the construction of a new bus depot and four park and ride stops. This project follows the cancellation of a tram project, which was endorsed by the municipal team in place between 2008 and 2014.

Toponymy
The toponym is derived from the name of the local Gallic people, the Ambiani, which in the 4th century, replaced the old name of the town  (the bridge on the Samara – Somme). Amiens then became the episcopal headquarters. In Picard, Amiens is called Anmyen.

Politics and administration

Political trends and results

Municipal administration
The number of inhabitants is estimated between 100,000 and 149,999, and the number of members of the municipal council is 55.

As a result of the French municipal elections of 2014, the distribution of seats is as follows:

The cantons

Amiens is divided into seven cantons:

Deputies

Amiens is divided into two legislative districts:
  (including Amiens II North-West, Amiens IV East, Amiens VIII North): Pascal Demarthe (PS) (he succeeded Pascale Boistard, named Secretary of State for the rights of women of the Second Valls Government on 26 August 2014)
  (including Amiens I West, Amiens III North-East, Amiens V South-East, Amiens VII South-West, Amiens VI South): Barbara Pompili (EELV)

List of mayors

On 4 April 2014, Brigitte Fouré (IDU (NC)) succeeded  (PS). Her list was elected in the second round on 30 March 2014 with 50.39% of the votes.

Judicial and administrative authorities
The Court of Appeal of Amiens has jurisdiction over the three departments of Picardy, with nine .

More recently, Amiens has become the seat of:
 The .
 The  of Picardy.

Environmental policy

Twin towns – sister cities

Amiens is twinned with:
Dortmund, Germany (1960)
Görlitz, Germany (1971)
Darlington, England, United Kingdom (1973)

Tulsa, United States (2006)

Amiens also has friendly relations with Mianyang in China and Amiens in Australia.

Population and society

Demography
The inhabitants of Amiens are called the Amiénois and their blason populaire is Chés maqueux d'gueugues (the eaters of nuts).

The population of Amiens has risen sharply since the mid-19th century: Its population doubled between 1850 and 1960, from 50,000 to 100,000 inhabitants, i.e. a gain of 50,000 people over this period of 110 years, and gaining about 30,000 others since (over 50 years only this time).

Demographic evolution
In 2017, the commune had 134,057 inhabitants.

Age structure
Amiens is distinguished by the youthfulness of its population. In 2017, more than 25% of the population of the city was less than 20 years old. The rate of people of an age over 60 years (19.3%) is also lower than the national rate (25.5%) and the departmental rate (25.4%). Like national and departmental allocations, the female population of the municipality is greater in number to the male population, with a rate of 52.5%, whereas the national rate is 51.6%.

Education

Primary and secondary education

In 2011, the Amiens agglomeration included 46 nursery schools, six elementary schools and 54 primary schools including eleven private. It had nine public colleges and six private colleges. Amiens has 24 schools:
 Vocational high schools: Acheuléen, Édouard-Branly, Edouard-Gand, La Providence (private), Montaigne, Romain Rolland,  (private), Saint-Martin (private), Saint-Rémi (private) and Saint-Riquier (private).
 General and technological high schools: Robert de Luzarches, La Hotoie, Jean Baptiste Delambre, La Providence (private),  (private), Saint-Martin (private), Saint-Rémi (private), Saint-Riquier (private) and Sainte-Famille (private).
 General secondary schools: , Madeleine Michelis (former high school for girls, established in 1883 by Marie Hugonin, wife of Charles Eugène Bertrand, mother of Paul Bertrand and niece of Bishop , Bishop of Bayeux and Lisieux – the inaugural speech was delivered by Jules Verne.)
 Technological lycées: Édouard-Branly, Édouard-Gand.

Higher education
The Amiens metropole welcomes one of the largest student populations in France. In 2013, the city had 26,000 students (3,300 in short-term) and 800 researchers who are divided into some 40 institutions of higher education, 32 laboratories, and 10 units associated with the National Scientific Research Centre or the French Institute of Health and Medical Research.

Health
The Centre Hospitalier Universitaire (CHU) or, Centre Hospitalier Universitaire of Amiens Picardie, is organized around four sites:
 South Hospital, Avenue René-Laënnec
 North Hospital, Place Victor-Pauchet
 Saint-Victor Centre, 354 Bis Boulevard de Beauville
 Obstetrics and Gynaecology Centre, 124 Rue Camille-Desmoulins

Since 2014, the four sites have been gradually gathered on the current site of the South Hospital, with the exception of the long stay units for the elderly remaining in the Saint-Victor Centre. This merger will be completed in 2016 and allow the CHU of Amiens to increase its national and inter-regional dimension. This group represents the largest hospital construction of France and one of the most important in Europe with more than €630 million for work and equipment. At the end of the work, the total space of the CHU of Amiens will be . It will total three blocks of hospitals with 400 beds each. The CHU of Amiens is the largest employer in the Picardy region. At the end of the merger, there will be 6,700 employees, 1,300 students of the health professions, and 1,250 consultants who will go there each day.

In order to maintain the availability of health units to the north of the city, a health center will open its doors in the first quarter of 2016, at the crossroads of the Avenue de l'Europe and the Rue Maurice-Ravel. This health space of  will host general practitioners and specialists of the CHU such as: cardiologist, a service of gynaecology-obstetrics, psychologists, dentist, and masseurs-physiotherapists.

Alongside the CHU, there are three private clinics, resulting from the consolidation of old clinics in the city. These care and hospitalisation institutions for medical, surgical, and obstetrics came together to create a private hospital center in the Vallée des Vignes quarter, south of the city.
 Polyclinic of Picardy, 43 Rue Alexandre Dumas
 Clinic of Europe, 5 Allée des Pays-Bas
 Victor Pauchet Heath Group, 2 Avenue Irlande

The CHU of Amiens figured in 11th place in the 2013 awards of the hospitals and clinics of the magazine Le Point. In this ranking, the CHU stands out for ankle surgery (3rd), hip prosthesis (5th), foot surgery (7th) and paediatrics (14th). In this same classification, the Victor Palmer Health Group, equipped with a solid "mother-to-child hub", gained a 5th place in the table for the gynaecological clinics and an 8th place for breast cancers.

In 2005, the CHU of Amiens became of international renown thanks to Professor Bernard Devauchelle, a native of the city, where his team performed the first partial face transplant in the world.

Sport

The city had already won the title in 1969. In 2013, Amiens Métropole had nearly 300 sports associations and Sports Recreation: approximately 150 associations are grouped within the Office of Amiens Metropole Sports and 150 others are referenced without being adherents. According to this same Office for Sports, Amiens has 25,000 members of sports clubs, excluding school and university members.

  American Football

The Amiens Spartiates, operating in the top-level Ligue Élite de Football Américain, have been champions of France in 2004, 2010 and 2012. Created in 1987, the club has more than 400 licensees.
  Archery
The Compagnie d'Arc d'Amiens is an archery club founded on 14 November 1803.

  Athletics

 is a multidisciplinary athletic club which particularly developed Stella Akakpo, specialist of the sprint and the relay. Bertrand Moulinet specialist of the 20 km and 50 km walk.
  Badminton

The AUC Badminton (Amiens University Badminton Club) was founded in 1986. Labeled "French school of badminton" by the French Badminton Federation, the club had 205 members in 2014. The city hosted the French National Badminton Championships in 2011.
  Ballon au poing

Each 15 August at the Parc de la Hotoie, Amiens receives the final stages of Ballon au poing.
  Fencing

The Circle of Fencing of Amiens Métropole is one of the oldest French clubs. It was succeeded in the Hall of arms of Amiens opened in 1886. The club held the Elite French Championships in 2001 and 2011.
  Field hockey

The , currently playing in  D1), were men's champions of France in 1981, 1982, 1986, 1987, 1988, 1989 and women's champions France in 1983, 1984, 1993, and 1995.
  Floorball

The , .
  Football

The main club in the city is Amiens SC. The team was finalist of the Coupe de France in 2001 and reached semifinals in 1930 and 2008, and played top-division Ligue 1 last time in 2020. Its associated women's team is CS Amiens Club. Before the 2012–2013 season, the team was known under the name of CS Amiens Montieres Etouvie.

AC Amiens is the second biggest club in the city, currently playing in semi-professional Championnat National level.
  Golf

The Golf Club D'amiens was founded in 1924. The club has 530 members in 2013.
  Handball

The club, a result of the merger of several Amiens clubs, was created in 1991.
  Ice hockey

The Gothiques d'Amiens, currently playing in Ligue Magnus (D1), were champions of France in 1999 and 2004, and runners-up in France for 1989, 1997, 1998, 2003 and 2006. The team plays at the Coliséum on the largest area of permanent ice in France (3800 seats). Amiens hosted
Division I of the 2006 Ice Hockey World Championships.
  Longue paume

Amiens won the Championship of France in 6/6, 10 times.
  Roller in-line hockey

The ,  (D1), were the runners-up of France in 2010, finalists of the Coupe de France in 2007 and finalists of the European Cup of clubs in 2008.
  Rowing

The Sport Nautique d'Amiens (SNA) was founded in 1866. With 465 members in 2013, the club currently competes in the 2nd division.
  Rugby union

The Rugby Club Amiénois (RCA) was founded in 1900. The men's first team plays in Fédérale 3.
  Swimming

The  swim team, is that of Jérémy Stravius, who was a triple world champion of swimming and Olympic champion in the 4 × 100 m relay. The club hosted the French Youth Championships in 2012 at the Coliséum
  Table tennis

The  (ASTT) was founded in 1945. It was twice crowned champion of France in 1968 and 1969. The men's first team also won the Coupe de France in 1966 and 1967.
  Tennis

Amiens Athletic Club (AAC) was founded in 1904. It is one of the 10 biggest clubs in France with almost 1,000 members in 2013.
  Volleyball

Since the start of the Tour de France in 1903, Amiens has hosted the start of a stage on ten occasions (1932, 1962, 1964, 1967, 1970, 1971, 1975, 1979, 1999, 2004) and the stage finish ten times (1932, 1962, 1964, 1967, 1970, 1971, 1975, 1993, 1999, 2015). Amiens hosted the finish of Stage 8 of the 2018 Tour de France.

On 29 April 2006, Amiens hosted the French Federation of ice hockey created during the World Cup of Ice Hockey of Group B (antechamber of the world elite) organised in Amiens at the same time. It is now installed at Issy-les-Moulineaux.

Each 15 August at the Parc de la Hotoie, the city receives the final stages of the Picardy sports and in particular those of the most emblematic, traditional Picard sport: The Ballon au poing. This Picard game is played by teams of six. To be able to hit the ball, players surround their hand and their wrist with a strip of canvas or leather.

Media

Newspapers and news magazines
 , the principal regional newspaper was founded in 1944. Its headquarters are located at 29 Rue de la République (it sold 64,587 copies in 2013).
 , an independent journal was founded in Amiens in 1999 by François Ruffin.
 Le Télescope d'Amiens, pure player of local information, was in publication from September 2012 to April 2014.

Free newspapers Metro and 20 minutes are distributed in the city, including in Amiens railway station.

Since 7 February 1996, the Communauté d'agglomération Amiens Métropole distributes a free weekly local newspaper: JDA (Journal des Amiénois). This publication, which appears every Wednesday, is distributed to all homes in the metropolitan area and is made available in public places (taken at about 95,000 copies) as well as on the internet site of the city in its digital version. Over time, the journal has evolved through various forms. Carried out by the Directorate of communication of Amiens Métropole, the latest form dates to 16 January 2015. In addition to the JDA which is attached to information on the whole of the territory of Amiens Métropole, the city has also had monthly publications specific to the city, which no longer exist today: Amiensville then Amiens Forum (from April 2009 to June 2014).

The  also sees its magazine distributed each month to the samariens homes, Vivre en Somme.

Several associative journals and specialised magazines are also distributed free of charge in public places: L'Écho des Amphis (student monthly), Bon Temps (quarterly magazine dedicated to the culture of Amiens and the art of living), Style & Co Amiens (deco magazine, trends and lifestyle), Night Clubbing Magazine (magazine of the nightlife in Amiens), Picardie la Gazette (economics weekly), Entreprises 80 (monthly of the ).

Audiovisual

Television channels

 The headquarters of France 3 Picardie, the channel that broadcasts Picardie Matin - Picardy Morning among other programming, is located on Rue Roger Martin du Gard, to the north of the city.
 Canal Nord, a local channel created in the mid-1980s in the northern districts, is now extended to the entire city via the Wibox network;
 , (broadcast suspended since 8 January 2014).
 , a local television channel on the internet.

FM radio stations
Most of the national radio stations broadcast their programs in the Amiens area and can be added to France Bleu Picardie (100.2 MHz) and local stations  (87.7 MHz) and  (97.7 MHz).

Digital terrestrial radio stations
As of 1 March 2015, the CSA has not selected Amiens for broadcast or experimentation of this broadcasting standard.

Telecommunications
The city of Amiens is covered for:
 Cable by  since 2002.
 Fibre optic by  since 2007 and by Orange since 2013.

Houses of worship

Buddhist
The Zen Sōtō Zen centre affiliated with the international Zen Association, on Rue Vulfran Warmé.

Catholic

 Notre-Dame Cathedral, Place Notre-Dame
Leased to the Society of St. Pius X from 1983 to 2007, it was sold, with the property complex to which it belonged, to Picardy in May 2007.
 , situated on Rue Jules Barni, the offices are run by the Society of St. Pius X according to the Tridentine Mass (an extraordinary form the Roman rite).
 The church of Saint Honoré known as the église de Beauvais, Rue Dom Bouquet
 The church of Saint-Acheul, Chaussée Jules Ferry
 The church of Saint-Firmin-le-Martyr, 137 Rue du Faubourg du Hem
 The , Rue Pingre
 The church of Sacré-Cœur, Rue de Mareuil
 The church of Saint-Jacques, Rue Saint-Jacques
 The , Rue Saint-Leu
 The church of Saint-Martin, Rue Morgan
 The church of Saint-Maurice, Rue Turgot
 The church of Saint-Pierre, Rue St Pierre
 The , Rue des Cordeliers
 The church of Saint-Roch, Rue de l'Abbaye
 The , Rue Vulfran Warmé
 The church of Sainte-Jeanne-d'Arc, Route de Rouen
 The church of Saint-Paul, Rue de l'Île-de-France
 The church of Saint-Pierre in the Montières quarter
 The church of Sainte-Marie-Madeleine in the Renancourt quarter
 The church of Sainte-Thérèse, Avenue de la Paix
 The church of the Immaculate Heart of Mary, Rue de Cagny

Jewish
The synagogue in Amiens is located at 12 Rue du Port d'Amont, near Pont-Beauville.

Mormon
The Church of Jesus Christ of Latter-day Saints has a place of worship on the Doullens road.

Muslim
The city of Amiens has the largest Muslim community of Picardy and one of the largest in the north of the France. Places of worship are evolving, several mosques are in a phase of expansion or relocation. The city has fifteen Muslim places of worship including eight independent prayer rooms and seven mosques:
 The An-Nour mosque where sits the Institute of the Arab-Muslim world of Picardy in Rue de la Hotoie.
 The Al-Fath mosque (currently moving premises), also the Association of Worship and Culture of Muslims in Picardy located at 375 Boulevard Beauvillé.
 The Al Badr mosque, also the Association of workers and Moroccan traders of Amiens, located at 33 Rue Winston-Churchill.
 The Masjid Al Muhsinin mosque located on the Rue de l'île-de-France.
 The Sounnahs mosque located Rue Victorine-Autier.
 The Chekkar mosque, also Association of the Committee of the Briqueterie located at 40 Rue Ronsard.
 The Mosque of the "19" is located at 19 Avenue de l'Europe and is home to the Association of Muslims in Picardy.

Several independent prayer rooms are present in the urban community. On the other hand, Muslim committees and associations exist in the image of the Islamic Cultural Centre of Amiens in the Rue de Savoie, the Muslim Cultural Freedom Association – Institute of Enlightenment and also the Association of residents of the home at 21 Route d'Allonville.

Protestant
The Protestant Church of Amiens, Rue Saint-Jacques.

Economy
As both an industrial hub and a services center, Amiens enjoys a large pool of workers with a labor pool of over 350,000 inhabitants and numerous professional training courses.

The magazine  elected Amiens "Most attractive city of France" for businesses, in 2009 and 2007, for the category less than 200,000 inhabitants. The city finished second in 2010, 2008 and 2006. The strengths of the city include a developed real estate business and taxation around the average for French cities. In addition, its geographical position in the center of the triangle "Paris – London – Brussels", is between three major European cities.

The magazine Challenges has also designated Amiens as "Best managed city of France", for the category large cities with more than 100,000 inhabitants, in 2011, 2010 and 2008.

Income of the population and taxation
In 2010, the median taxable household income was €22,539, which placed Amiens at 177th place among the 31,525 communes with more than 39 households in metropolitan France.

In 2017, the proportion of taxable households was 45%.

Employment
In 2017, the population aged 15 to 64 years amounted to 91,555 persons, among which there were 64.5% of assets including 51.4% having a job and 13.1% of unemployed.

There were 78,284 jobs in the employment area, against 80,908 in 2007. The number of assets employed and residing in the area of employment being 47,588. The concentration of jobs indicator is 164.5%, which means that the employment area offers three jobs for every two active inhabitants.

Agriculture has very little representation among Amiens jobs with only 0.2%, just as the construction sector which represents 4.3% of jobs. Unlike these two sectors whose share is below the national average, the tertiary sector (trade, transport, services) represents a significant part of the Amiens workforce, 42.3%. Public services (public administration, education, health, social work) accounts for 42.7%. Industry includes 10.5% of jobs.

The Goodyear Tire and Rubber Company announced more than 400 job cuts in May 2008 at the Amiens plant, which has had 1,450 employees; in March 2009, the management announced new  of a thousand jobs.

Businesses and shops

On 31 December 2015, at Amiens, there were 10,436 businesses: 51 in agriculture, forestry and fisheries, 394 in industry, 685 in construction, 7,110 in trade, transportation and various services and 2,196 were related to the administrative sector.

In 2018, 1,505 companies had been recorded as being established in Amiens, including 1,206 companies owned by sole proprietors.

Philatelic publishers Yvert et Tellier (catalogues of quotes) and l'Écho de la timbrologie (magazine) have their management in Amiens, even if they have more of their services in the Paris region. The Gueudet Group, one of the largest car dealers in France, was established at Amiens in 1918. The old textile tradition of the city remains with the factory of Lee Cooper France (122 employees).

Since the end of World War II, much of the city's economy was tied to automotive equipment with companies such as Valeo, Goodyear and Sumitomo-Dunlop tires. In 2003, the American Goodyear company bought Dunlop. These two companies suffered financially through late 2007 and early 2008, and in response, the American Goodyear company headquarters in the United States offered workers a change to their working hours and the number of posts, which a high percentage of staff refused.

Procter & Gamble, settled in Amiens in 1964 to produce soap, and inaugurated its new detergents unit in 1966. More than 85% of its production is intended for export.

The Amiens plant employs approximately 930 people.

Since the mid-1990s, the city has tried to convert the economy towards the internet and telephony industries. Many call centres (Intracall center, Coriolis France, Médiamétrie) have opened mainly within the city, region or state. The Unilog (now Logica) computer service company has installed a service center in Amiens (the CSA).

It manages the Amiens - Glisy Aerodrome.

Culture, tourism and heritage

The strategic position of Amiens makes it an attractive destination for a weekend or a few days, from Paris, Lille or Brussels.

Amiens has the label of Towns and Lands of Art and History since 1992. Within this framework, the host of the heritage organises guided tours on themes intended for an audience of adults and children, with educational workshops. A signposted circuit allows an independent tour of the town, with information panels offering comment on places and notable buildings.

Amiens has an important historical and cultural heritage, and an accessible and varied natural heritage, on which tourism is based.

Places and monuments
The information given below is relative only to a brief selection.

Notre-Dame d'Amiens

The city is famous for its Notre-Dame Cathedral, masterpiece of Gothic art and one of the largest cathedrals in the world by its interior volume. The largest religious and medieval building of France, its interior could twice hold Notre Dame de Paris.

Dating back to the 13th century, its construction is due to the wealth of the city in the Middle Ages and to the fire of the Romanesque cathedral which stood previously. Three architects, including Robert of Luzarches succeeded to complete the construction.

Amiens Cathedral is notable for the coherence of its plan, the beauty of its three-tier interior elevation, the particularly fine display of sculptures on the principal façade and in the south transept, and inlays of its floor. It is also described by John Ruskin as "Gothic, clear of Roman tradition and of Arabian taint, Gothic pure, authoritative, unsurpassable, and unaccusable."

Regarded as the archetype of the classic Gothic style, the cathedral also presents some elements of the radiant Gothic style and flamboyant Gothic. The speed of construction, barely 70 years for the shell (1220 to 1269), explains this remarkable homogeneity of style. Its façade is decorated with more than 3,000 statues, gargoyles and chimeras.

Registered since 1981 as a World Heritage Site of UNESCO, it is a "masterpiece of world heritage". For a second time in 1998, it is a monumental step on the Camino de Santiago. Despite the two World Wars of the 20th century, which severely affected the city, it managed to stay intact.

A show of the reproduction of the original polychromy of façades, discovered as a result of recent laser cleaning, is given annually for free in December and during the summer period. The show is a projection on the façade of slides in color.

The  is a set of reliefs on the foundations of the western façade formed series of quatrefoil medallions, carved in a representative agrarian calendar and the signs of the zodiac.

Belfry

The origin of the Belfry of Amiens dates back to the establishment of the commune of Amiens by Louis VI. It is mentioned for the first time in an arbitral award issued by the chapter of Amiens in 1244.

Symbolizing the independence of the commune, it was formerly used for meetings of the notables of the city and then as archive rooms, weapons store and prison. A spotter nearby monitored arrivals and warned the population of the external dangers. During the Middle Ages, the building was repeatedly engulfed by fire.

The belfry is composed of a base in white cut stone, built in the 15th century between 1406 and 1410, a stone superstructure bell tower built from 1749 with Baroque volutes at its base, and a dome covered with slate and then the renowned arrow weather vane. At the time, a huge 11-ton bell was installed inside, it was later destroyed along with the dome, whose copper component melted, in the bombardment and fire of the city on 19 May 1940. Abandoned and devoid of a roof since World War II, the monument was fully restored between February 1989 and July 1990.

Located on the Place au Fil, the old central square of the city before the arrival of the railway and the rise of the Rue des Trois Calloux, the belfry is adjacent to Les Halles and the back of the city hall.

Since July 2005, the belfry of Amiens is a UNESCO World Heritage Site, as part of a set of 56 Belfries of Belgium and France which were inscribed because of their architecture and their importance in the rise of municipal power in Northern France and Belgium. The belfry is also recorded in the inventory of Historic Monuments.

Cirque Jules-Verne

In 1845, the traditional fair of Saint-Jean, formerly held at Place René Goblet, was transferred to Place Longueville. It is a wide esplanade that took the place of the Longueville bastion, after the demolition of the city walls in the early 19th century. Each year, a temporary circus is established for this occasion.

In 1865, a circus company emerged to claim a permanent circus, which would be built in wood by the Schytte contractor in 1874. However, expensive maintenance prompted the municipality to consider the construction of a new building. The decision was made in 1886 under the leadership of Mayor Frédéric Petit and the work began.

The Chief Architect of the Somme, a disciple of Gustave Eiffel, was responsible for its construction. It was inspired by the Cirque d'hiver of Paris but with a cast metal frame, supplemented by brick from the local countryside. The architect of civil buildings, Charles Garnier, claimed that the frames should be hidden with a plaster imitating stone. The "moderninst" design of Ricquier, who chose to display the structure, and to favor local material such as brick, is visible at the rear of the monument.

As a completely modern project, it hosted two steam engines, dedicated to fully electric lights and central heating. Since its construction, it was also the first circus which included a buffet and a refreshment bar. The cost of the construction of the building finally reached double the forecast. In 1888, the new city councilor responsible for festivals and celebrations, Jules Verne, was responsible for monitoring the work, and it was he who opened it on Sunday 23 June 1889, for the opening of the fair and the centenary of the French Revolution:

The roof was damaged by a shell in 1916. The circus was the setting for Federico Fellini's The Clowns (1971), and the film by Jean-Jacques Beineix, Roselyne et les lions (1989), with Isabelle Pasco as lead actress. The largest of the circuses of the province with its 3,000-seats, the building has acquired a multidisciplinary use for decades of performances of theatre, dance, concerts, galas, sports and public meetings.

Renovated in 2003, it now bears the name of Cirque Jules Verne.

It is one of seven in France and is still in use today.

The house of Jules-Verne

In 1882, Jules Verne and his wife, Honorine, rented the house at the corner of Rue Charles-Dubois and Boulevard Longueville until 1900. Acquired in 1980 by the city, the house is labeled Maisons des Illustres by the Ministry of Culture.

Tour Perret

Opposite the Gare d'Amiens, is located the Tour Perret (from the name of its architect Auguste Perret).

The Church of Saint-Leu

This church was built at the end of the 15th century, on the model of the hall-churches. It is dedicated, as its district, to Saint Leu, referring to the 7th century bishop who was exiled to the Vimeu. It has three naves. A flamboyant portal adorns the base of the steeple. The latter, struck by lightning, had to be rebuilt at the beginning of the 16th century. The ends of beams are carved. Stone and wood statues date from the 17th century. The choir houses the glory of the Duthoit brothers.

Other notable buildings or monuments

Architecture from antiquity
 Numerous archaeological excavations have uncovered remains from proto-historic times to the Roman era. Two skylights cut in the last development of Place Gambetta, allow observation of a few remains of the forum. And, important remnants of a large Gallo-Roman theatre uncovered in early 2007, have been dismantled and stored in accordance with the rules of archaeological conservation, during the redevelopment of the Gare quarter in March 2007.
 The archaeological garden of Saint-Acheul testifies to the presence of Paleolithic man in the Somme Valley some 450,000 years ago. A stratigraphic cut, classified as an historic monument since 1947, allows visualisation of successive strata of the Somme Valley.

Architecture from the Middle Ages
 The Church of Saint-Germain, is disused, but where exhibitions are regularly held on the colourisation of the cathedral and the St-Germain quarter, and historical competitor of the Saint-Leu quarter. The animosity, between the populations of the two districts has marked the history of Amiens. This church has a high and oddly leaning tower. Affected by the bombing of 1940, it was returned temporarily to worship in October 1965, after a thorough restoration.

 The mills Passe avant and Passe arrière (at Saint-Leu).

Architecture from the Renaissance
 The renaissance façade of the Maison du Sagittaire (moved to adjoin the Logis du Roy).
 The Logis du Roy (Faculty of Arts until 2003).
 The House of the Bailiwick or Malmaison.
 The Citadelle: First ravelin, erected north of the Montrescu gate, the fortress was located in 1531 by F. di Giorgio on the order of Francis I (Francis I gate, with sculpted salamanders). After the capture by the Spaniards and its takeover by Henry IV (1597),  received the charge to rebuild the defences of the city.

Architecture from the 17th and 18th centuries
  (cloister Dewailly)
 Abbey of Saint-Acheul (17th and 18th centuries) and the Church (built in 1760 on the vault of Fermin of Amiens)
 The water tower and fountains of Amiens (1753)
 The façade of the former theatre (now a bank). It was moved  to the line of the Rue des Trois-Cailloux.
 The  of the 17th and 18th centuries.
During this period, it housed the headquarters of the 8th infantry division.
 The city hall (partly 18th century and partly 19th century). Made in the regional style of stone and brick, with bedrock of sandstone, and stone pavilions. On the pediment is found the statues of King Louis VI and Bishop Geoffroi, which granted freedom to Amiens in 1115.

Architecture from the 19th century
 The Palace of Justice was built from 1865 to 1880 on the site of the Abbey of Saint-Martin-les-Jumeaux (1073 to 1634) established at the supposed place of the sharing of the cloak of Saint Martin and the convent of the religious Order of the Celestines (1634 to 1781). Les Célestins, whose order was abolished in 1778, left the premises in 1881.
 Henriville quarter, including the hotel Acloque (neo-Louis XIII style) and the Saint-Martin Church (neo-Gothic, built by Louis Antoine in 1874).
 The , which was reopened after renovation, in 2006, including the present neo-Gothic dining room and antique desk. The tower was covered with an armillary sphere commissioned from artist François Schuiten, who also signed the mural extending the imaginary garden of yesteryear.
 The Madeleine Cemetery (Cimetière de la Madeleine) contains a number of listed monuments including the sculpture on Jules Verne's Tomb. His tomb is decorated with a sculpture by Albert Roze symbolising the resurrection: Jules Verne lifting the slab to glimpse the modern world.
  where various Amiens personalities are buried and where there is a domed tomb with a sculpture by Auguste Rodin.
 The former insurance house, Rue Marotte, built by E. Ricquier in 1893 (now a bar).
 The monastery of the visitation, built between 1839 and 1841 by Herbault.
 The Palace of Justice, new buildings constructed by Cheussey in 1834 and 1846.
 The renovations by Cheussey (1816–1848) of the cathedral.
 Place Saint-Denis (now place René Goblet) is designed in 1839 by the architect François Auguste Cheussey.
 The parish church Saint-Firmin-le-Martyr by Cheussey in 1843.
 The  of the architect .
 The  of architect .

Architecture from the 20th century
 The hotel Bouctot-Vagniez (seat of the Regional Chamber of commerce and industry), built by Louis Duthoit in 1909, a rare Art Nouveau building in Amiens.
 The English quarter, located on the road from Longueau, including a British phone box. An island of London in the heart of Amiens.
 The ESIEE Amiens, designed by the architects Jean Dubus and Jean-Pierre Lott. A modern building identified by its saucer.
 Complex of Art Deco buildings on Rue Cauvin, as well as the Gueudet garages (Rue des Otages).
 The Saint-Pierre church, destroyed in 1940 and rebuilt in 1949 by Evrard, in glass and concrete, with a brick bell tower.
 : The headquarters of the daily life of Amiens, first Progrès de la Somme, belongs to a set of Art Deco buildings.
 The monument of Philippe Leclerc de Hauteclocque by Jan and Joël Martel in 1950.
 The Carmel of the Holy Spirit, on the Montjoie Hill, built in 1965 by architect .
 The Coliséum, inaugurated on 5 January 1996, built by the architect  (designer of the Palais omnisports de Paris-Bercy).
 The Stade de la Licorne, built in 1999 by architects  and Jean-Paul Morel.

Architecture from the 21st century
 The Cinema Gaumont Amiens opened in 2005. It is the work of architects . The interior decoration is the work of Christian Lacroix and artists Alain Balzac and François Michel.
 The Verrière de la place de la gare d'Amiens, also called the Canopy. It is the work of architect Claude Vasconi, known especially for the Forum des Halles in Paris. A subject of a controversy when it opened in March 2008, the canopy is designed to create a link between the pedestrian zone of the city center and the ZAC Gare la Vallée, and to become a business district of Amiens. This is one of the largest canopies in Europe.
 The Zenith of Amiens by Massimiliano Fuksas, in the Renancourt quarter between the Mégacité and the Hippodrome. Construction was completed in 2008.

Environmental heritage

Floral City awarded the maximum score of 4 flowers in the floral contest of cities and villages of France to Amiens, and it offers a particularly rich wooded heritage. With 38,650 trees (excluding woodland), of which 17,000 are situated on highways, Amiens to win the national tree award. In 2014, the city ranked in the top 10 greenest cities of France.

Presenting itself as a city concerned with the environment, Amiens has made the link between the city and nature a central axis of its metropolitan development project called Amiens 2030.

The Hortillonages
They are also known as the "floating gardens of Amiens". The hortillonnages are sometimes called "Little Venice of the North", because of the canals.

Hortillon means market garden in Picard, and derives from the Latin hortillus, small garden. It is navigated in flat bottom boats, formerly called barque à cornet [Cornet boat], due to the very raised front, which allows the boats to easily dock on the fragile shores of the cultivated fields. It is the upstream port, located at the foot of the cathedral, where a weekly market is held on the water, although the arrival the growers by boat can only be accomplished once a year, in summer.

Amiens Metropolitan Zoo
It was the mayor of the time, who decided to develop the site in 1949. Originally intended as an entertainment venue, the zoo began its mission of conservation, education and research between 1970 and 1980. They live in environments, which are close to their natural environment, favouring their well-being. In 2014, the zoo received 161,128 visitors. Traditionally, entry is free on 14 July, Bastille Day.

The main parks and gardens

As a floral city, 4 flowers were awarded in 2013 by the National Council of Cities and Villages of France for the competition of floral cities and villages. The national Council of Cities and Villages awarded the 2012 National Tree Prize to the city for "its exceptional and innovative management of its wooded heritage" with its 37,000 trees, some more than a century old.

Cultural heritage

Museums

 The Musée de Picardie is a key site in the history of the National Museum, since it is the first building to have been built in France to serve as a museum. Built under the Second Empire on the model of the new Louvre of Napoleon III, it opened its doors to the public in 1867 after the visit of the emperor. Considered the French model of a 19th-century museum, it was nicknamed the "Little Louvre of the Province". It hosted very early rich collections which are now divided into four departments: Archaeology in the basement, the Medieval art on the ground floor, fine arts on the ground floor and the first floor, and modern and contemporary art on the first floor. Rooms are also devoted to temporary exhibitions. The department of fine arts brings together paintings by Van Dyck, Jordaens, Ruysdael, El Greco, Ribera, Tiepolo, Guardi, Fragonard, Chardin, Boucher, Quentin de La Tour, Vouet, Corot and Courbet. The modern and contemporary collection is represented by Picasso, Picabia, Balthus, Dubuffet, Hélion, Bacon, Miró and Manessier. Access to the picture galleries of the first floor is by a mounumental staircase in a setting dedicated to the famous wall compositions of Pierre Puvis de Chavannes.

 The Hotel de Berny Museum is a regional museum of local art and history. This building, typical of the Louis XIII architecture, was built in 1634 as a mansion of the treasurers of France. Property of Gérard de Berny, Senator of the Somme in the first half of the 20th century, has restored the façades and settled its collections. Located a few metres from the cathedral, this Museum of France retains an exceptional collection of woodwork, furniture and objets d'art (tapestries, ceramics, ironworks) and memories (objects and arrays) of Amiens personalities: Jules Verne, Choderlos de Laclos, Édouard Branly, Jean-Baptiste Gresset, Vincent Voiture, Joseph Pinchon, Maréchal Leclerc. The museum is currently undergoing a complete renovation of its buildings and an overhaul of the installation of its museum collections.

 The , labeled Maisons des Illustres, is the home of the most translated writer in the world after Agatha Christie: Jules Verne. He lived here from 1882 to 1900 with his wife Honorine, and wrote part of his work in this mansion of the 19th century. To visit is to enter into the intimate and creative universe of the author. The building largely retains its original decor and opens almost all of its rooms, from the ground floor to the attic. The permanent collections are presented on two floors, in the attic, the tower and the belvedere of the house: Approximately 700 collected objects evoke the personality, sources of inspiration and memories of Jules Verne. Costumed tours, performances, parties and literary encounters of thematic conferences are also regularly organised.
 The Gallery of stained glass is located in the workshop of master glassmaker Claude Barre, in a 16th-century house near to the cathedral. It presents a large collection to the public, including religious stained-glass windows and interiors, from the 11th to the 19th century. The gallery also offers demonstrations on the techniques of stained glass.
 The  (MCA or MACU) was inaugurated on 19 March 1966 by André Malraux. A major  in the region, it has two exhibition halls for contemporary art; the Matisse Hall and the Giacometti Room, which both regularly host exhibitions of sculptures, photographs and plastic arts.
 The Fonds régional d'art contemporain of Picardie (FRAC Picardie), created in 1983, aims to promote contemporary art, in particular through dissemination actions. As early as 1985, FRAC Picardie had specialised its action in the field of the design and its contemporary dimensions. It is also interested in new media, on and off paper, since artists are now working through the video medium. This has allowed it to acquire a good reputation in France and abroad. In 30 years, the FRAC has brought together a unique collection of a thousand drawings which include major names of contemporary art, such as Basquiat, Dubuffet, Oppenheim, Twombly, Matta, Manessier, etc. In 2001, discussions are undertaken to construct a new building to accommodate the fonds and its collections.

Amiens was strongly tipped to host the Louvre II.

Concert halls

The city has a number of concert spaces, mostly small venues, and pubs also host numerous concerts throughout the year.
 The Zenith of Amiens was inaugurated in September 2008. With a capacity of 6,000 seats, it is the work of the Italian architect Massimiliano Fuksas. Holder of the required Zénith label, this facility allows the hosting of national and international headline acts and ensures a high level of services and organisation. The accessibility of the place by motorway (A16, A29, A1), and the possibilities of free parking, the venue radiates to Belgium and to the Paris region.
 The  is the Park of the Congress and Exhibitions of Amiens.
 , the biggest grand circus of France, has about 1,700 seating spaces since its renovation in 2003. It welcomes, among other shows, concerts.
 The  offers many live shows and concerts. It manages also New Dreams, a room for 120 seated or 300 standing, which also hosts concerts.
With high acoustic quality, it offers 370 seats on three levels. It offers mainly classical concerts.
Created in 1987 in a former banana warehouse of the Belu Wharf, La Lune has a capacity of 250 seats.

Theaters

 The  has the  accreditation from the Ministry of Culture. Cultural place of the city, its mission is broad and covers many disciplines: theatre, music, dance, cinema and visual arts. It brings together two theatres: the Grand Théâtre (1,070 seats) and the Petit Théâtre (300 seats).
 The  (ComDePic) is one of the city's main theatres. The theatre has a room of 400 places and houses its own company.
Its activities range from creation to dissemination, training and theatrical information. Focused on contemporary theatre, the Maison du Théâtre also hosts local theatrical companies and their creations.
 The puppet theatre "Chés cabotants of Amiens", founded in 1933, is the heir of some eighty cabotan theatres which were created in Amiens in the 19th century. Amiens is known as the French capital of the puppet son. Since 1997, a theatre is dedicated to Chés Cabotans of Amiens and his popular hero . It is located in the heart of the Saint-Leu quarter.
 The Boîte à Rire is a café-théâtre, created in September 2012. This 48-seat hall is located near to Amiens Cathedral, and proudly displays a one-man show and Boulevard theatre.

Cultural Centers
Amiens Métropole has nine cultural centers which cover much of the metropolitan area: Six in various districts of Amiens, and three in the neighbouring communes of Longueau, Camon and Glisy. These outreach facilities working in the field of art and creation are openly oriented "venues". Open to all, they offer an eclectic programme; theatre and concerts, shows for young people and dance, projections of films, exhibitions, meetings and debates, etc. In 2013, they accommodated 48,000 people.
 The Briqueterie was installed in 2001 on the site of the former Friant military barracks in the Elbeuf quarter. As part of its programming, it hosts concerts, as well as exhibitions, public theatre and shows for youths. To this end, it has a room that can accommodate 120 people.
 The Jacques Tati cultural center is located in the heart of the Pierre Rollin. Opened in January 2008, the Jacques Tati theatre has 198 seats and hosts plays, public youth performances, concerts, etc.
 The Léo-Lagrange cultural center is located in Saint Germain district. A venue for exhibitions, meetings and performances of music, theatre, dance and circus, it has a room of 85 seats named the chapel.
 The CSC is installed in the heart of the Etouvie quarter. Its missions include the dissemination of exhibitions and performances. To this end, it has a room of 150 seats.
 The Étoile du sud is located in the neighbourhood Victorine-Autier. This cultural center is specialized in urban cultures and has the peculiarity of having a computer recording studio.
 The Safran is located in the north quarter of Amiens. This 'multidisciplinary and experimental'  offers diverse programming: Drama, public youth shows, dance and exhibitions. Its theatre hall, known as Gérard-Philipe has 220 spaces. Saffron also hosts a music complex, the Cité Carter, which offers rehearsal studios, recording sessions and organises concerts of contemporary music in its 250-seat hall.

Libraries

Libraries currently constitute a network of 28 facilities spread over the whole territory of the metropolis. The heart of this network is the Louis Aragon library, located on Rue de la République. Built between 1823 and 1826, it is one of the oldest municipal libraries in France. It experienced several improvements, including campaigns of work between 1982 and 1993, which have endowed it with new spaces: Two auditoriums, a youth space, a library and an art library.

Registration and borrowing is free for all of the people of Amiens in all libraries. Two libraries also provide service to neighborhoods and the communes of the agglomeration, and there is home delivery of documents for people with reduced mobility.

Cinemas
There are three cinemas:
 The Cinema Gaumont Amiens (12 rooms, 2,700 seats) was inaugurated in September 2005. Located just steps from the Amiens railway station, it has a large lobby and a 600-seat room. A 500-space car park is located under the cinema. It is the work of the architects  and its interior decoration was entrusted to Christian Lacroix. In 2011, this multiplex received 887,000 cinemagoers.
 The Cine-Saint-Leu (one room with 250 seats) was inaugurated in October 2000, after the closure of the Regent Cinema located near the railway station. An arthouse cinema, it is part of the major cultural facilities of the Cathedral Centre. Its eclectic and cinephile programming offers the possibility to see the original version of contemporary films.
 The Studio Orson Welles (one room with 180 seats in the ).

Cultural events and festivals
Throughout the year, Amiens is the seat of many cultural, traditional or economic events.

Music

Even if it rarely achieves national notoriety (with the notable exceptions of Les Fatals Picards, Olympe, Albin de la Simone, Disiz and Rokia Traoré), the Amiens music scene is active and developed. In this dynamic, the  scene holds a central place and is organised around a collective, Amiens Burning, which is responsible for networking the breeding ground for the local rock scene, to accompany its projects, and organize concerts.

Since their creation,  and Cité Carter also provide support to the local scene. For example, the Cité Carter produces a compilation each year, with local groups.

Here is an overview of the Amiens music scene:
 Rock: The Rabeats (cover band of The Beatles), The Beyonders, Molly's, Sobo, The Void, Violent Scaredy Cats, Elegant Fall, Gene Trio
 Electro: The Name (who created the soundtrack for the series Bref), The Blue
 Pop: Olympe, Nathaniel Isaac Smog, 
 Metal: Anorak, DSK, Vakarm, Decline of Humanity, Altered beast, Infected Society
 Hip Hop/Rap: Disiz (born in Amiens), D.S.C. (Dirty South Crew), Lj Crackus
 French singers: Albin de la Simone (born in Amiens), EmilieAnneCharlotte
 World Music: Rokia Traoré (Malian-born singer who lived in Amiens in the 1990s)
 Multiple genres: Les Fatals Picards, Zic Zazou (group of nine musicians created in 1982 and winner of La Grande Battle in November 2012)

Vocal practice is represented by the Regional Choir of Picardy, the University Choir of Picardie, and the Choir of France Picardy.

One can also include the Harmony Saint-Pierre, a fanfare of 70 musicians, which has become a local institution since its inception in 1894.

Literature
Amiens saw rise, over the centuries, to major writers. In the first half of the 17th century, Vincent Voiture, poet and letter writer, was the darling of the Précieuses for the fluidity of his style. In 1634, he was member of the 1st Académie française. In 1678, Charles du Fresne, sieur du Cange, nicknamed "the French Varro", published his Glossarium in 3 volumes. This glossary of medieval Latin is still authoritative today. He was named perpetual president.

In 1782, the Amiens native Choderlos de Laclos published Les Liaisons dangereuses where he staged a depraved nobility. Considered one of the masterpieces of 18th-century literature, the book has toured the world and is known as an Oscar-winning film adaptation.

However, the great name of Amiens literary life is Jules Verne. He animated all intellectual activity, giving balls and parties, while his wife held a famous salon. He often attended the library of the industrial society, which subscribed to numerous scientific journals. Engaged in local life, he was Councillor of Amiens from 1888 to 1904.

Amiens does appear explicitly in his novels but there are however characteristic elements of the city such as the cathedral and the river. This is the case, for example, for the imaginary city of Ragz in Le secret de Wilhem Storitz. In the novel Une fantaisie du docteur Ox, the inhabitants of the fictional town of Virgamen, the Virgamenois, refer directly to the Amiénois and their prudent nature.

In 1875, he delivered before the Academy of Sciences, Letters and Arts of Amiens a speech entitled "An ideal city: Amiens in the year 2000" where he portrays himself wandering in a forward-thinking city of Amiens. Since then, the city has built a tourist route from this text.

He died in Amiens in 1905, and he deeply marked the town's footprint, so that today many places, monuments and events bear his name. He rests at  where one can read on his tomb: Vers l'immortalité et l'éternelle jeunesse. [Towards immortality and eternal youth].

In 1885, Englishman John Ruskin published the Bible of Amiens, which was translated into French, extensively annotated and prefaced, in 1904, by Marcel Proust. This book dedicated to Notre-Dame d'Amiens was the opportunity for Proust to recall his admiration for the English author and the Cathedral of Amiens.

In the second half of the 19th century, Associate Professor of philosophy and brilliant scholar translated Kant's work in French and thus enabled its dissemination in France.

A native of Amiens, Paul Bourget published  in 1889, a novel today considered his major work. He was elected, 5 years later, to the Académie française.

Born in Sainte-Anne district in 1885, Roland Dorgelès published  in 1919. A masterpiece written from his notes taken at the Front, the novel won the Prix Femina the same year. A member of the Académie Goncourt in 1929, he was elected president in 1954 until his death in 1973.

Cinema
Several films or scenes from films were shot in Amiens and its surroundings.
 1946: Jéricho by Henri Calef with Nadine Alari, Pierre Brasseur and Jacques Charon
 1959: Head Against the Wall, film of Georges Franju, with Pierre Brasseur and Jean-Pierre Mocky
 1970: The Clowns of Federico Fellini around the 
 1973: La Rose de Fer of Jean Rollin with Françoise Pascal, Hugues Quester and Nathalie Perrey
 1976: La Saga des Français: La Rumeur, film of Michel Pamart and Marcel Trillat
 1980: La femme enfant, film of Raphaële Billetdoux, with Klaus Kinski
 1989: Roselyne et les lions of Jean-Jacques Beineix, with Isabelle Pasco filmed around Cirque Jules-Verne
 1991: Walking a Tightrope of Nico Papatakis, with Michel Piccoli also filmed around Cirque Jules-Verne
 1994: Sister My Sister of Nancy Meckler with Julie Walters and Joely Richardson
 1997: Arlette of Claude Zidi, with Josiane Balasko and Christopher Lambert
 1999: Je suis né d'une cigogne, film of Tony Gatlif, with Romain Duris
 2000:  of 
 2002: Carnage of Delphine Gleize
 2002: Paris selon Moussa, film of Cheik Doukouré
 2008: Paul Rondin est...Paul Rondin, short film of Frédéric Vin, with 
 2008: Blanche, short film of Eric Griffon du Bellay, with Romane Bohringer and Clémence Poésy
 2008: Louise Hires a Contract Killer, film of Gustave Kervern and Benoît Delépine, with Yolande Moreau and Benoît Poelvoorde filmed around the Tour Bleue (before its destruction), in the Étouvie quarter.
 2009: Ricky of François Ozon with Alexandra Lamy
 2010: Copacabana, film of Marc Fitoussi, with Isabelle Huppert
 2012: , film of 
 2013: , film of Amélie Van Elmbt

Comics
Amiens is a stronghold of comics in France. A whole generation of designers and Amiens writers make the city an important creative center of the 9th art.

The city was also the birthplace or home of big names in the comic strip universe, such as the Amiens native Joseph Pinchon, creator of the character of Bécassine; Paul Gillon, winner of the Grand Prix de la ville d'Angoulême and also .

Regional culture

 Chés Cabotans d'Anmien or the Cabotins of Amiens is a small Picardy traditional puppet theatre founded in 1933. He talks in Picard, exclusively. Traditionally a lackey costume (wearing a red velvet tricorne hat) dressed, Lafleur is cheerful, dynamic, independent and resourceful; its motto is: "bin mier, bin boere, pis did rin foere!" (Drink well, eat well and then do nothing).
 The Picard language is recognised regional language. It is spoken in France in the Picardy and Nord-Pas-de-Calais regions, and in Belgium in the Province of Hainaut. Various associations work for the promotion and development of Picardy culture expressed in theatre, song, in spoken tales but also in writing: Novels, journals, poetry, etc. Since 1993, the  has developed within the "Office Culturel Régional de Picardie" a cultural policy for the language and the Picardy culture. "The Agency for Picard", created in 2008, is headquartered in Amiens. Picard is taught at the University of Amiens.
 The blasons populaires are surnames or the nicknames given to the inhabitants of cities and the Picardy villages. These surpitchets sometimes come from the history of the city, sometimes a verbal game, sometimes through a mockery of people. The nickname of the inhabitants of Amiens is: Chés Maqueus d'gueugues d'Anmien [Amiens nut eaters] in reference to an episode of the Spanish invasion. On 11 March 1597, the Spanish armies developed a ploy to seize the city: The soldiers of Hernán Tello de Portocarrero, Governor of Doullens, disguised as peasants, came to the gates of the walls with nuts. The starving citizens of Amiens opened the doors and the Spaniards took the city.

Gastronomic specialities
During December, the town hosts the largest Christmas market in northern France. Amiens, in the image of the Picardy region, has a rich gastronomic heritage. Here are some of the specialities:

The region is also known for "flamiche aux poireaux", a puff pastry tart made with leeks and cream.

Other dishes include:

The Summer Rambo apple cultivar originated near Amiens in the 16th century.

Notable people

Sportspeople

Linked to the city

Heraldry, logo and motto

Logo of the city of Amiens
In 1991, the municipality formed around Gilles de Robien designed a new logo, incorporating the Fleur-de-lis and the Ivy leaf present on the coat of arms, placed side by side in red with a background of grey or white, depending on usage.
 A stamp representing the arms of the city was issued in 1962, this issue fitted into one of the Arms of cities. Its power of postage was five cents. It was issued on 23 January 1962 and withdrawn from sale on 23 January 1977. A first day was arranged in Amiens on 21 July 1962. Artist Arman made a board collage of this stamp.

See also

Notes

References

Further reading
 : Document used to draft this article.

External links

 Official website
 Directory of City Councils 
 
 The Cathedral of Amiens colored !
 Columbia University Media Center for Art History – Amiens Cathedral Website
 Amiens – Business Directory
 Pictures of Amiens and the Somme

 
Communes of Somme (department)
Prefectures in France
Ambiani
Gallia Belgica
Picardy
Cities in France